Be Our Guest is a 1966 Australian TV series produced by Alan Burke for the ABC. It was set in a motel near an airport where international guests stayed.

Cast
Sean Scully
Lorraine Bayly
 Jacki Weaver.

References

External links
Be Our Guest at Nostalgia Central

1966 Australian television series debuts